The Nuthouse is a 1951 Swedish comedy film directed by Hasse Ekman.

Plot summary
During excavations in Stockholm in the year 2248 45,000 feet film from the 1940s by master director Hasse Ekman is found. The material is in disarray but the Society for Ancient Film Research compiles material that is believed to master his artistic intentions.

The story is compiled from several of Hasse Ekman's 1940s movies. Among them: Första divisionen, Flames in the Dark, Ombyte av tåg, Excellensen, Kungliga patrasket, Fram för lilla Märta, Lilla Märta kommer tillbaka and Banketten.

Cast
Hasse Ekman as Hans Hasseson Ekman/second lieutenant Bråde/Kim/Kurre
Lars Hanson as Colonel von Blankenau 
Elsie Albiin as Elisabeth, the Colonels daughter 
Gunnar Sjöberg as Captain Hansson, Chairman in Lillköpings Homofilurer 
Edvin Adolphson as Göran Dahl, Physical training instructor at Lillköpings boarding school 
Stig Järrel as Birger Sjögren, teacher in dead languages at the boarding school
Inga Tidblad as Eva, maladjusted housewife, Birgers wife
Hilda Borgström as Charlotta Dahl, widow, owner of Lillköpings Bryggerier 
Sonja Wigert as Inga, Charlottas granddaughter 
Eva Henning as Monika, daughter to art photographer Gottfrid
Douglas Håge as Lillköpings Mayor/Gottfrid, dirty old man, his brother
Ester Roeck-Hansen as Olga, ex. waitress, Monikas mother 
Thor Modéen as Vårby, Dahls right-hand man, escaped mental patient 
Birger Malmsten as Kurre, physiotherapist, Charlottas foster son 
Ernst Brunman as Sergeant Bottin/Editor at Lillköpingsposten 
Ernst Eklund as Manfred Gripe, works manager in the homeopathic firm Sjövall & Holm, black-marketer
Sture Lagerwall as	Jocke Grip, lieutenant at Anti-aircraft batteries and Manfreds son, pimp in his civilian life
Katie Rolfsen as Viran Blomster, cleaning woman at the City hotel, bastard daughter to Gripe
Ragnar Falck as Birger Rask, plane spotter, spy for unfriendly power
Gunn Wållgren as Maggan Håkansson, traveling in drugs
Hugo Björne as Pontus Bråde, pyromaniac and headmaster at Lillköpings boarding school, second lieutenant Brådes father
Linnéa Hillberg as	Mrs. Bråde, anonymous letter correspondent, second lieutenant Brådes mother
Åke Fridell as Chairman in the Society for Ancient Film Research in the prologue
Harriet Andersson as his secretary in the prologue
Gustaf Hiort af Ornäs as Curator Brinkebo in the Society for Ancient Film Research in the prologue

External links

1951 films
Films directed by Hasse Ekman
1950s Swedish-language films
Swedish comedy films
1951 comedy films
1950s Swedish films